Sebastian Wimmer (born 15 January 1994) is an Austrian footballer who plays as a defensive midfielder for FC Juniors OÖ.

References

External links
 

1994 births
Living people
Footballers from Linz
Austrian footballers
Austria youth international footballers
Austrian expatriate footballers
Austrian expatriate sportspeople in Germany
Expatriate footballers in Germany
Association football defenders
LASK players
FK Austria Wien players
SV Horn players
SC Wiener Neustadt players
SC Paderborn 07 players
VfL Wolfsburg II players
FC Viktoria Köln players
FSV Zwickau players
FC Juniors OÖ players
Austrian Football Bundesliga players
2. Liga (Austria) players
3. Liga players
Regionalliga players